Inguiniel is a commune in the Morbihan department in Brittany in north-western France.

Demographics
Inhabitants of Inguiniel are called in French Inguinielois.

See also
Communes of the Morbihan department

References

External links

 Service animation Enfance Jeunessede la Mairie d'Inguiniel 
 Cultural Heritage 
 Mayors of Morbihan Association 

Communes of Morbihan